Arms of dominion are the arms borne both by a monarch and the state in a monarchy.

In this respect they are both the national arms and the arms of the nation's monarch, who is the monarchy's sovereign, and are thus simultaneously the personal arms of the monarch and the arms of the state he or she reigns over.

Background 

The famous heraldic author John Brooke-Little, Norroy and Ulster King of Arms, in his book 'An Heraldic Alphabet' (page 38) wrote regarding arms of dominion:

Furthermore, in his 1983 revision to 'Boutell's Heraldry', Brooke-Little stated (page 222):

Therefore, in most hereditary monarchies the arms of dominion are also the arms of state; they cannot be used by anyone else; no matter how closely related they are to the monarch. Thus younger members of royal houses will use arms that are similar to those of the monarch, but they are made slightly different by marks that are placed on the shield, including but not restricted to, labels. This is called cadency, and is equally applicable to the arms of non-royal families, but is not as enforced. Within royal families, however, it is rigidly enforced by the heraldic authorities of the particular country.

In republics, the arms of the head of state (who is not the sovereign by definition) are not the same as the arms of the state (which is sovereign – or rather – the people of the state are sovereign). For example, the coat of arms of the United States and the arms of the various presidents are not the same. This is something that has been well established since pre-modern times; the arms of the various doges of the republics of Venice and Genoa were not the same as the republics over which they ruled.

Common external elements in arms of dominion are royal pavilions, which are used in most arms of dominion, modern and historical, except in the arms of countries that belong to the Commonwealth of Nations.

Arms of dominion currently in use

Arms of dominion used in former monarchies

Bibliography
 
 

Coats of arms